Sutter Creek (formerly spelled Sutter's Creek and Suttercreek; formerly named Suttersville) is a city in Amador County, California, United States. The population was 2,501 at the 2010 census, up from 2,303 at the 2000 census. It is accessible via State Route 49.

History

The community takes its name from nearby Sutter Creek, which in turn has the name of early California developer John Sutter.

Sutter's discovery of gold at nearby Coloma in January  1848 triggered the California Gold Rush. After all his workers left him to go on their own hunts for gold, Sutter moved to Mormon Island with a couple of hands. After about two weeks miners flooded the island, so Sutter and his hands left and returned to Sutter Creek. Sutter said: "I broke up the camp and started on the march further south, and located my next camp on Sutter Creek, now in Amador County, and thought that I should be there alone. The work was going on well for a while, until three or four traveling grog-shops surrounded me, at from one-half to ten miles (16 km) distance from the camp. Then, of course, the gold was taken to these places, for drinking, gambling, etc., and then the following day they were sick and unable to work, and became deeper and more indebted to me, particularly the Kanakas [native Hawaiians]."  Shortly thereafter Sutter moved out of Sutter Creek and back to his fort.

Sutter Creek became a destination for fortune hunters.  A post office was established in 1852, and Sutter Creek became a town in 1854 that incorporated in 1913.

Although plenty of placer gold was found there, gold-bearing quartz deposits were discovered in 1851, and mining those deposits for gold became the mainstay of the local economy for many years. With the prosperity brought by quartz mining, Sutter Creek became a boomtown. By 1932, the Central Eureka mine, begun in 1869, had reached the  level. By 1939, it was the best-paying mine in Sutter Creek. The mines continued operations until 1942, when most gold mines were closed for manpower reasons during World War II.

Today, Sutter Creek is a tourist town with many shops and restaurants. The town itself is registered as California Historical Landmark #322.

Geography

According to the United States Census Bureau, the city has a total area of 2.6 square miles (6.6 km), all of it land.

Climate
According to the Köppen Climate Classification system, Sutter Creek has a hot-summer Mediterranean climate, abbreviated "Csa" on climate maps. Summers are long and hot, while winters are cool but relatively short. As typical of mediterranean climates, precipitation is concentrated to winter months, with summers being extremely dry.

Demographics

2010
The 2010 United States Census reported that Sutter Creek had a population of 2,501. The racial makeup of Sutter Creek was 2,272 (90.8%) White, 10 (0.4%) African American, 34 (1.4%) Native American, 65 (2.6%) Asian, 5 (0.2%) Pacific Islander, 40 (1.6%) from other races, and 75 (3.0%) from two or more races. Hispanic or Latino of any race were 219 persons (8.8%).

The Census reported that 2,500 people (100% of the population) lived in households, 1 (0%) lived in non-institutionalized group quarters, and 0 (0%) were institutionalized.

There were 1,168 households, out of which 258 (22.1%) had children under the age of 18 living in them, 500 (42.8%) were opposite-sex married couples living together, 109 (9.3%) had a female householder with no husband present, 51 (4.4%) had a male householder with no wife present.  There were 65 (5.6%) unmarried opposite-sex partnerships, and 15 (1.3%) same-sex married couples or partnerships. 418 households (35.8%) were made up of individuals, and 239 (20.5%) had someone living alone who was 65 years of age or older. The average household size was 2.14.  There were 660 families (56.5% of all households); the average family size was 2.77.

The population was spread out, with 466 people (18.6%) under the age of 18, 191 people (7.6%) aged 18 to 24, 426 people (17.0%) aged 25 to 44, 768 people (30.7%) aged 45 to 64, and 650 people (26.0%) who were 65 years of age or older.  The median age was 49.4 years. For every 100 females, there were 84.3 males.  For every 100 females age 18 and over, there were 83.2 males.

The homeowner vacancy rate was 2.6%; the rental vacancy rate was 14.6%.  1,355 people (54.2% of the population) lived in owner-occupied housing units and 1,145 people (45.8%) lived in rental housing units.

2000
As of the census of 2000, there were 2,303 people, 1,025 households, and 658 families residing in the city. The racial makeup of the city was 91.45% White, 0.22% African American, 1.30% Native American, 1.04% Asian, 0.30% Pacific Islander, 2.13% from other races, and 3.56% from two or more races. Hispanic or Latino of any race were 5.82% of the population.

Of the 1,025 households, 27.0% had children under the age of 18 living with them, 51.2% were married couples living together, 9.7% had a female householder with no husband present, and 35.8% were non-families. 32.1% of all households were made up of individuals, and 18.2% had someone living alone who was 65 years of age or older.  The average household size was 2.25 and the average family size was 2.79.

23.2% of residents were under the age of 18, 5.9% from 18 to 24, 20.3% from 25 to 44, 28.1% from 45 to 64, and 22.4% who were 65 years of age or older.  The median age was 45 years. For every 100 females, there were 83.4 males.  For every 100 females age 18 and over, there were 78.6 males.

The median income for a household in the city was $47,000, and the median income for a family was $55,795. Males had a median income of $46,563 versus $30,188 for females. The per capita income was $23,100.  About 4.9% of families and 7.8% of the population were below the poverty line, including 10.5% of those under age 18 and 6.5% of those age 65 or over.

Politics

The city, as well as Amador County as a whole, consistently votes as a republican constituency.

Landmarks
Sutter Creek has two buildings on the National Register of Historic Places
Knight Foundry
Sutter Creek Grammar School

Notable people
 Charles B. Hanford (1859–1926), Shakespearean actor, born in Sutter Creek.
 Leland Stanford was one of Sutter Creek's most famous residents.
 John Vukovich, MLB player for various teams, grew up in Sutter Creek and attended Amador High School.

High schools
Sutter Creek is home to Amador High School. It has fewer than 1000 students and  competes athletically in the Mother Lode League of the CIF Sac-Joaquin Section.

References

External links
 Sutter Creek Government home page
 Sutter Creek Community home page

Cities in Amador County, California
Mining communities of the California Gold Rush
California Historical Landmarks
John Sutter
Incorporated cities and towns in California
1848 establishments in California
Populated places established in 1848